In geometry, a point reflection (point inversion, central inversion, or inversion through a point) is a type of isometry of Euclidean space. An object that is invariant under a point reflection is said to possess point symmetry; if it is invariant under point reflection through its center, it is said to possess central symmetry or to be centrally symmetric.

Point reflection can be classified as an affine transformation. Namely, it is an isometric involutive affine transformation, which has exactly one fixed point, which is the point of inversion. It is equivalent to a homothetic transformation with scale factor equal to −1. The point of inversion is also called homothetic center.

Terminology 
The term reflection is loose, and considered by some an abuse of language, with inversion preferred; however, point reflection is widely used. Such maps are involutions, meaning that they have order 2 – they are their own inverse: applying them twice yields the identity map – which is also true of other maps called reflections. More narrowly, a reflection refers to a reflection in a hyperplane ( dimensional affine subspace – a point on the line, a line in the plane, a plane in 3-space), with the hyperplane being fixed, but more broadly reflection is applied to any involution of Euclidean space, and the fixed set (an affine space of dimension k, where ) is called the mirror. In dimension 1 these coincide, as a point is a hyperplane in the line.

In terms of linear algebra, assuming the origin is fixed, involutions are exactly the diagonalizable maps with all eigenvalues either 1 or −1. Reflection in a hyperplane has a single −1 eigenvalue (and multiplicity  on the 1 eigenvalue), while point reflection has only the −1 eigenvalue (with multiplicity n).

The term inversion should not be confused with inversive geometry, where inversion is defined with respect to a circle.

Examples 

In two dimensions, a point reflection is the same as a rotation of 180 degrees.  In three dimensions, a point reflection can be described as a 180-degree rotation composed with reflection across a plane perpendicular to the axis of rotation.  In dimension n, point reflections are orientation-preserving if n is even, and orientation-reversing if n is odd.

Formula 
Given a vector a in the Euclidean space Rn, the formula for the reflection of a across the point p is

In the case where p is the origin, point reflection is simply the negation of the vector a.

In Euclidean geometry, the inversion of a point X with respect to a point P is a point X* such that P is the midpoint of the line segment with endpoints X and X*. In other words, the vector from X to P is the same as the vector from P to X*.

The formula for the inversion in P is

x* = 2a − x

where a, x and x* are the position vectors of P, X and X* respectively.

This mapping is an isometric involutive affine transformation which has exactly one fixed point, which is P.

Point reflection as a special case of uniform scaling or homothety
When the inversion point P coincides with the origin, point reflection is equivalent to a special case of uniform scaling: uniform scaling with scale factor equal to −1. This is an example of linear transformation.

When P does not coincide with the origin, point reflection is equivalent to a special case of homothetic transformation: homothety with homothetic center coinciding with P, and scale factor −1. (This is an example of non-linear affine transformation.)

Point reflection group

The composition of two point reflections is a translation.  Specifically, point reflection at p followed by point reflection at q is translation by the vector 2(q − p).

The set consisting of all point reflections and translations is Lie subgroup of the Euclidean group.  It is a semidirect product of Rn with a cyclic group of order 2, the latter acting on Rn by negation.  It is precisely the subgroup of the Euclidean group that fixes the line at infinity pointwise.

In the case n = 1, the point reflection group is the full isometry group of the line.

Point reflections in mathematics
 Point reflection across the center of a sphere yields the antipodal map.
 A symmetric space is a Riemannian manifold with an isometric reflection across each point.  Symmetric spaces play an important role in the study of Lie groups and Riemannian geometry.

Point reflection in analytic geometry
Given the point  and its reflection  with respect to the point , the latter is the midpoint of the segment ;

 

Hence, the equations to find the coordinates of the reflected point are

 

Particular is the case in which the point C has coordinates  (see the  paragraph below)

Properties 
In even-dimensional Euclidean space, say 2N-dimensional space, the inversion in a point P is equivalent to N rotations over angles  in each plane of an arbitrary set of N mutually orthogonal planes intersecting at P. These rotations are mutually commutative. Therefore, inversion in a point in even-dimensional space is an orientation-preserving isometry or direct isometry.

Therefore, it reverses rather than preserves orientation, it is an indirect isometry.

Geometrically in 3D it amounts to rotation about an axis through P by an angle of 180°, combined with reflection in the plane through P which is perpendicular to the axis; the result does not depend on the orientation (in the other sense) of the axis. The group type is one of the three symmetry group types in 3D without any pure rotational symmetry, see cyclic symmetries with n = 1.

The following point groups in three dimensions contain inversion:
Cnh and Dnh for even n
S2n and Dnd for odd n
Th, Oh, and Ih

Closely related to inverse in a point is reflection in respect to a plane, which can be thought of as a "inversion in a plane".

Inversion centers in crystallography

Molecules contain an inversion center when a point exists through which all atoms can reflect while retaining symmetry. In crystallography, the presence of inversion centers distinguishes between centrosymmetric and noncentrosymmetric compounds. Crystal structures are composed of various polyhedra, categorized by their coordination number and bond angles. For example, four-coordinate polyhedra are classified as tetrahedra, while five-coordinate environments can be square pyramidal or trigonal bipyramidal depending on the bonding angles. All crystalline compounds come from a repetition of an atomic building block known as a unit cell, and these unit cells define which polyhedra form and in what order. These polyhedra link together via corner-, edge- or face sharing, depending on which atoms share common bonds. Polyhedra containing inversion centers are known as centrosymmetric, while those without are noncentrosymmetric. Six-coordinate octahedra are an example of centrosymmetric polyhedra, as the central atom acts as an inversion center through which the six bonded atoms retain symmetry. Tetrahedra, on the other hand, are noncentrosymmetric as an inversion through the central atom would result in a reversal of the polyhedron. It is important to note that bonding geometries with odd coordination numbers must be noncentrosymmetric, because these polyhedra will not contain inversion centers. 

Real polyhedra in crystals often lack the uniformity anticipated in their bonding geometry. Common irregularities found in crystallography include distortions and disorder. Distortion involves the warping of polyhedra due to nonuniform bonding lengths, often due to differing electrostatic attraction between heteroatoms. For instance, a titanium center will likely bond evenly to six oxygens in an octahedra, but distortion would occur if one of the oxygens were replaced with a more electronegative fluorine. Distortions will not change the inherent geometry of the polyhedra—a distorted octahedron is still classified as an octahedron, but strong enough distortions can have an effect on the centrosymmetry of a compound. Disorder involves a split occupancy over two or more sites, in which an atom will occupy one crystallographic position in a certain percentage of polyhedra and the other in the remaining positions. Disorder can influence the centrosymmetry of certain polyhedra as well, depending on whether or not the occupancy is split over an already-present inversion center.

Centrosymmetry applies to the crystal structure as a whole, as well. Crystals are classified into thirty-two crystallographic point groups which describe how the different polyhedra arrange themselves in space in the bulk structure. Of these thirty-two point groups, eleven are centrosymmetric. The presence of noncentrosymmetric polyhedra does not guarantee that the point group will be the same—two noncentrosymmetric shapes can be oriented in space in a manner which contains an inversion center between the two. Two tetrahedra facing each other can have an inversion center in the middle, because the orientation allows for each atom to have a reflected pair. The inverse is also true, as multiple centrosymmetric polyhedra can be arranged to form a noncentrosymmetric point group. 

Noncentrosymmetric compounds can be useful for application in nonlinear optics. The lack of symmetry via inversion centers can allow for areas of the crystal to interact differently with incoming light. The wavelength, frequency and intensity of light is subject to change as the electromagnetic radiation interacts with different energy states throughout the structure. Potassium titanyl phosphate, KTiOPO4 (KTP). crystalizes in the noncentrosymmetric, orthorhombic Pna21 space group, and is a useful non-linear crystal. KTP is used for frequency-doubling neodymium-doped lasers, utilizing a nonlinear optical property known as second-harmonic generation. The applications for nonlinear materials are still being researched, but these properties stem from the presence of (or lack thereof) an inversion center.

Inversion with respect to the origin

Inversion with respect to the origin corresponds to additive inversion of the position vector, and also to scalar multiplication by −1. The operation commutes with every other linear transformation, but not with translation: it is in the center of the general linear group. "Inversion" without indicating "in a point", "in a line" or "in a plane", means this inversion; in physics 3-dimensional reflection through the origin is also called a parity transformation.

In mathematics, reflection through the origin refers to the point reflection of Euclidean space Rn across the origin of the Cartesian coordinate system. In three dimensions, this sends , and so forth.

Representations

It is a product of n orthogonal reflections (reflection through the axes of any orthogonal basis); note that orthogonal reflections commute.

In 2 dimensions, it is in fact rotation by 180 degrees, and in dimension , it is rotation by 180 degrees in n orthogonal planes; note again that rotations in orthogonal planes commute.

Properties
It has determinant  (from the representation by a matrix or as a product of reflections). Thus it is orientation-preserving in even dimension, thus an element of the special orthogonal group SO(2n), and it is orientation-reversing in odd dimension, thus not an element of SO(2n + 1) and instead providing a splitting of the map , showing that  as an internal direct product.

 Together with the identity, it forms the center of the orthogonal group.
 It preserves every quadratic form, meaning , and thus is an element of every indefinite orthogonal group as well.
 It equals the identity if and only if the characteristic is 2.
 It is the longest element of the Coxeter group of signed permutations.

Analogously, it is a longest element of the orthogonal group, with respect to the generating set of reflections: elements of the orthogonal group all have length at most n with respect to the generating set of reflections, and reflection through the origin has length n, though it is not unique in this: other maximal combinations of rotations (and possibly reflections) also have maximal length.

Geometry
In SO(2r), reflection through the origin is the farthest point from the identity element with respect to the usual metric. In O(2r + 1), reflection through the origin is not in SO(2r+1) (it is in the non-identity component), and there is no natural sense in which it is a "farther point" than any other point in the non-identity component, but it does provide a base point in the other component.

Clifford algebras and spin groups

It should not be confused with the element  in the spin group.

Reflection through the identity extends to an automorphism of a Clifford algebra, called the main involution or grade involution.

Reflection through the identity lifts to a pseudoscalar.

See also
 Affine involution
 Circle inversion
 Clifford algebra
 Congruence (geometry)
 Estermann measure
 Euclidean group
 Kovner–Besicovitch measure
 Orthogonal group
 Parity (physics)
 Reflection (mathematics)
 Riemannian symmetric space
 Spin group

Notes

References

Euclidean symmetries
Functions and mappings
Clifford algebras
Quadratic forms